Georg Lind (born Juris Liepiņš (Georg Leepin); 1871 – 26 September 1957) was a Latvian long-distance runner. He competed in the men's marathon at the 1908 Summer Olympics for the Russian Empire.

References

1871 births
1957 deaths
Athletes (track and field) at the 1908 Summer Olympics
Latvian male long-distance runners
Latvian male marathon runners
Olympic competitors for the Russian Empire
Place of birth missing